The meridian 30° west of Greenwich is a line of longitude that extends from the North Pole across the Arctic Ocean, Greenland, the Atlantic Ocean, the Southern Ocean, and Antarctica to the South Pole.

The 30th meridian west forms a great circle with the 150th meridian east, and it is the reference meridian for the time zone UTC-2.

Between the 45th and 61st parallels north, the meridian forms the boundary between the Gander and Shanwick Oceanic air traffic control areas, and for this reason is also known as the "Molson-Guinness Line".

From Pole to Pole
Starting at the North Pole and heading south to the South Pole, the 30th meridian west passes through:

{| class="wikitable plainrowheaders"
! scope="col" width="125" | Co-ordinates
! scope="col" | Country, territory or sea
! scope="col" | Notes
|-
| style="background:#b0e0e6;" | 
! scope="row" style="background:#b0e0e6;" | Arctic Ocean
| style="background:#b0e0e6;" |
|-
| 
! scope="row" | 
| H.H. Benedict Range (Northern Peary Land)
|-
| style="background:#b0e0e6;" | 
! scope="row" style="background:#b0e0e6;" | Frederick E. Hyde Fjord
| style="background:#b0e0e6;" |
|-
| 
! scope="row" | 
| Bronlund Fjord (Southern Peary Land)
|-
| style="background:#b0e0e6;" | 
! scope="row" style="background:#b0e0e6;" | Independence Fjord
| style="background:#b0e0e6;" |
|-
| 
! scope="row" | 
| Mainland and Sokongen Island
|-
| style="background:#b0e0e6;" | 
! scope="row" style="background:#b0e0e6;" | Atlantic Ocean
| style="background:#b0e0e6;" |
|-
| style="background:#b0e0e6;" | 
! scope="row" style="background:#b0e0e6;" | Southern Ocean
| style="background:#b0e0e6;" |
|-valign="top"
| 
! scope="row" | Antarctica
|-
|}

See also
29th meridian west
31st meridian west
Beyond Thirty

References

w030 meridian west